Ryan Gardner (born April 18, 1978) is a Canadian-born Swiss former professional ice hockey forward. He last played for HC Lugano, Fribourg-Gottéron, SC Bern, ZSC Lions and HC Ambrì-Piotta in the National League (NL). He won the Swiss national championship four times. Representing the Swiss national team he captured a silver medal at the 2013 World Championships.

Career 
While his father Dave Gardner was playing professionally in Switzerland, Gardner played in the country as a youngster. Later, he spent time with the London Knights and North Bay Centenntials in the OHL, before moving back to Switzerland. He made his debut in the top-flight National League A (NLA) at HC Ambrì-Piotta during the 1997-98 season.

In 2001, he signed with HC Lugano, where he stayed until 2007. During his time in Lugano, he captured the 2003 and 2006 Swiss championship. He then spent three years with the ZSC Lions, winning the NLA title in 2008 and the 2008-09 Champions Hockey League. From 2010 to 2015, he turned out for SC Bern, winning another championship in 2013 and the Swiss cup competition in 2015.

At the conclusion of the 2014–15 season, on April 2, 2015, Gardner was traded by SC Bern to HC Fribourg-Gottéron in exchange for Timo Helbling. In April 2016, he signed a deal to return to HC Lugano, where he played until the conclusion of the 2016-17.

Gardner announced his retirement from professional ice hockey in February 2018.

International career 
Gardner has represented Switzerland internationally at the IIHF World Championships and 2014 Winter Olympics. He won silver with the Swiss team at the 2013 World Championships.

Personal info 
He comes from a hockey family: His father Dave Gardner, uncle Paul Gardner and grandfather Cal Gardner all played professionally.

Career statistics

Regular season and playoffs

International

References

External links

1978 births
HC Ambrì-Piotta players
HC Lugano players
Ice hockey players at the 2014 Winter Olympics
Lausanne HC players
Living people
London Knights players
North Bay Centennials players
Olympic ice hockey players of Switzerland
SC Bern players
Ice hockey people from Toronto
Swiss ice hockey centres
ZSC Lions players